Mitchell Graham Fowles (born 18 December 1970) is a former English cricketer.  Fowles was a right-handed batsman who bowled right-arm medium pace.  He was born at Worcester, Worcestershire

Fowles made his debut for Herefordshire in the 1992 Minor Counties Championship against Wales Minor Counties.  From 1992 to 1997, he represented the county in 30 Championship matches, the last of which came against Wiltshire.  His MCCA Knockout Trophy debut for the county came against Staffordshire in 1992.  From 1992 to 1997, he represented the county in 12 Trophy matches, the last of which came against Shropshire.

He also represented Herefordshire in 2 List A matches against Durham in the 1995 NatWest Trophy and Somerset in the 1997 NatWest Trophy.  In his 2 matches, he took 3 wickets at a bowling average of 48.66, with best figures of 2/73.

References

External links
Mitchell Fowles at Cricinfo
Mitchell Fowles at CricketArchive

1970 births
Living people
Sportspeople from Worcester, England
English cricketers
Herefordshire cricketers